Solarigraphy is a concept and a photographic practice based on the observation of the sun path in the sky (different in each place on the Earth) and its effect on the landscape, captured by a specific procedure that combines pinhole photography and digital processing. Invented around 2000, solarigraphy (also known as solargraphy) uses photographic paper without chemical processing, a pinhole camera and a scanner to create images that catch the daily journey of the sun along the sky with very long exposure times, from several hours to several years. The longest known solarigraph was captured over the course of eight years. Solarigraphy is an extreme case of long-exposure photography, and the non-conventional use of photosensitive materials is what makes it different to other methods of sun paths capture such as the Yamazaki´s "heliographys"

Beginnings 

In 2000, Diego López Calvín, Sławomir Decyk and Paweł Kula started a global and synchronized photographic work known as "Solaris Project". This work, which mixes together art and science, is based on the active participation through the Internet of people interested in the apparent movement of the Sun, that is photographed with artisan pinhole cameras loaded with photosensitive material and subjected to very long exposures of time. Previous experiments with long exposures on photosensitive papers and with registration of the sun arcs in the sky were done at the end of the 90's in Poland by the students Paweł Kula, Przemek Jesionek, Marek Noniewicz and Konrad Smołenski and in the 80's by Dominique Stroobant, respectively.

To do this they invented the word SOLARIGRAFIA, SOLARIGRAPHY, whose root "SOLAR" refers to the object of the study: the Sun. The suffix "GRAPHY" indicates the possibility of writing and the link "i" refers to the INTERNATIONAL nature of the project, as well as to the INTERNET, this being the method they used from the start to make the concept available and to get people from around the world to participate, creating the site http://solarigrafia.com. Since then, as other photographers or amateurs have known of it and practiced it, new projects, workshops, exhibitions and collections on the web and physical spaces have been developed, about solarigraphy.

Characteristics 

SOLARIGRAPHS are images that show real elements that cannot be seen with the naked eye, they represent the apparent trajectories of the sun in the sky due to the rotation of the Earth on its axis. They are mostly made with pinhole cameras and very long exposures, from one day to six months between the winter solstice and the summer solstice or vice versa. The images show the different paths of the Sun the observer has according to the respective latitude over the earth's surface.

The cameras are loaded with photosensitive materials (mainly photographic paper in black and white) so that the sunlight produces a direct blackening on the surface. The trajectories of the sun and the landscape image appear directly on the surface of the paper forming a negative that is digitised and treated with image processing software. These images also provide information about the periods in which the sun does not appear to be shining as it is hidden by clouds, which provides information about the weather.

In López Calvín's words: "In these images, nature looks at itself beyond the limits of our perception. It is a kind of vision that will bring us closer to what is important within a landscape seen through the eyes, if they had them, of stones or trees. People, animals, clouds or rain are too ephemeral. Everything moves very fast and we lack details that need more time to be perceived. Thanks to this concept, we discover a way of seeing something that cannot be seen with the naked eye. The Sun is a clock that invites us to reflect on the relationship between light, space and time."

Technical basis and procedure 

The key to the technique is the nature of photographic paper that darkens by direct light without having to develop it, thus giving the ultra-low sensitivity necessary for such long exposures. Although lenses can be used in obtaining solarigraphs with exposure times of a few hours, for longer exposures a pinhole or small hole through which the light enters the camera is more convenient, allowing the use of homemade cameras, usually using empty drink cans, film canisters or recycled plastic tubes.

A photographic paper for black and white is placed inside the container that acts as a camera, and once the camera is fixed in the chosen place, usually pointing east, south or west, the pinhole is uncovered allowing the light to enter until the camera is collected.

The image, already visible at that time on the paper, is negative and ephemeral, since the light continues to expose the emulsion if it is shown, so it is necessary to protect the paper from the light and scan it so it can be viewed in a useable format. This second digital part of the process includes inverting the image to make it positive and usually increasing the contrast. Different circumstances make solarigraphs to show different colours depending on the colour of the light and the paper chosen, but also on conditions such as temperature and humidity at different times of impression, in addition to chemical changes in the paper during exposure.

References

External links 

 Videos about solarigraphy.
"Solargraphy", short film documentary. Taro, Gaizka y Zapiór, Maciej, 2014
"En la solarigrafía nada se interpone entre la superficie del sol y el papel". El Faro de Vigo, farodevigo.es, 23 August 23, 2012.
 Solarigrafia escolhida como Picture of the day, January 21, 2012, by NASA.
 Solargraphy camera simulation: flat vs cylinder vs hemi-cylinder pinhole cameras.

Photographic processes
Alternative photographic processes
Astrophotography